Griffin Matthew Easter (born November 6, 1991) is an American cyclist, who currently rides for UCI Continental team .

Major results
2016
 9th Overall Tour d'Azerbaïdjan
2017
 1st Stage 6 Vuelta a Colombia
2018
 1st Stage 3b Tour de Beauce
2019
 1st Stage 4 Tour de Beauce

References

External links

American male cyclists
1991 births
Living people
Cyclists from California
People from Claremont, California
Vuelta a Colombia stage winners